The Efes Pilsen World Cup 9 was an international basketball tournament played in Turkey in August 2010. There were four teams: Argentina, Turkey, Lebanon and Canada, and the winning team was Argentina.

Round-robin

All time UTC+3.

Final standings

See also
Basketball World Cup

External links
Official website

Basketball World Cup (Turkey)
2010–11 in Turkish basketball
Sports competitions in Ankara
2010–11 in Canadian basketball
2010–11 in Argentine basketball
2010–11 in Lebanese basketball
2010s in Ankara